Elias Harb (born 20 March 1939) is a Lebanese sports shooter. He competed in the mixed skeet event at the 1984 Summer Olympics.

References

1939 births
Living people
Lebanese male sport shooters
Olympic shooters of Lebanon
Shooters at the 1984 Summer Olympics
Place of birth missing (living people)